Emergency Squad is a 1974 Italian poliziottesco film directed by Stelvio Massi.

Cast 
Tomas Milian as Tomas Ravelli
Mario Carotenuto as Lavagni
Gastone Moschin as "The Marseilles"
Ray Lovelock as Rino
Stefania Casini as Marta Hayworth
Ilaria Guerini as Fede 
Guido Leontini as Mario Berlotti aka "Cranio"
Enzo Andronico as Alberto
Giuseppe Castellano (actor) as Beppe

Release
Emergency Squad was distributed theatrically in Italy on 24 April 1974 by Jumbo Cinematografica. The film grossed a total of 985,981,000 Italian lire. Film historian and critic Roberto Curti described Emergency Squad as a "surprising commercial hit" on its initial theatrical release.

Director Stelvio Massi recalled that on the film's premiere in Rome he was deeply embarrassed by the audience's reaction to a scene where bandits shoot a police car that explodes as the audience greeted the scene with rapturous applause.

See also
 List of Italian films of 1974

Footnotes

Sources

External links

1970s Italian-language films
Poliziotteschi films
1970s crime action films
Films directed by Stelvio Massi
Films scored by Stelvio Cipriani
1970s Italian films